McMinnville Municipal Airport  is three miles southeast of McMinnville, in Yamhill County, Oregon.  The FAA's National Plan of Integrated Airport Systems for 2009–2013 categorized it as a general aviation facility. It is across Oregon Route 18 from the Evergreen Aviation & Space Museum, home to the Hughes H-4 Hercules Spruce Goose flying boat.

Many U.S. airports use the same three-letter location identifier for the FAA and IATA, but this airport is MMV according to the FAA and has no IATA code.

West Coast Airlines Douglas DC-3s served McMinnville for several years commencing in 1947.

Facilities
It has two asphalt runways: 4/22 is 5,420 by 150 feet (1,652 x 46 m) and 17/35 is 4,340 by 75 feet (1,323 x 23 m).

In the year ending January 16, 2009 the airport had 63,500 aircraft operations, average 173 per day: 98% general aviation and 2% military. 132 aircraft were then based at the airport: 66.7% single-engine, 8.3% multi-engine, 3.8% jet, 8.3% helicopter and 12.9% glider.

Oregon International Air Show
In September 2019, the Oregon International Air Show was held at the McMinnville Airport. The air show is normally held at the Hillsboro Airport, however, there was runway construction taking place at the time.

See also
Willamette Valley Medical Center

References

External links 
 McMinnville Airport at City of McMinnville website
 Aerial photo from USGS The National Map
 

Airports in Yamhill County, Oregon
Buildings and structures in McMinnville, Oregon